Alfred Leslie Rowse  (4 December 1903 – 3 October 1997) was a British historian and writer, best known for his work on Elizabethan England and books relating to Cornwall.

Born in Cornwall and raised in modest circumstances, he was encouraged to study for Oxford by fellow-Cornishman Sir Arthur Quiller-Couch. He was elected a fellow of All Souls College and later appointed lecturer at Merton College. Best known of his many works was The Elizabethan Age trilogy. His work on Shakespeare included a claim to have identified the 'Dark Lady of the Sonnets' as Emilia Lanier, which attracted much interest from scholars, but also many counterclaims.

Rowse was in steady demand as a lecturer in North America. In the 1930s, he stood unsuccessfully for Parliament as a Labour candidate, though later in life he became a conservative.

Life and politics
Rowse was born at Tregonissey, near St Austell, Cornwall, the son of Annie (née Vanson) and Richard Rowse, a china clay worker. Despite his modest origins and his parents' limited education, he won a place at St Austell County Grammar School and then a scholarship to Christ Church, Oxford, in 1921. He was encouraged in his pursuit of an academic career by a fellow Cornish man of letters, Sir Arthur Quiller-Couch, of Polperro, who recognised his ability from an early age. Rowse endured doubting comments about his paternity, thus he paid particular attention to his mother's association with a local farmer and butcher from Polgooth, near St Austell, Frederick William May (1872–1953). Any such frustrations were channelled into academia, which reaped him dividends later in life.

Rowse had planned to study English literature, having developed an early love of poetry, but was persuaded to read history. He was a popular undergraduate and made many friendships that lasted for life. He graduated with first class honours in 1925 and was elected a fellow of All Souls College the same year. In 1929, he proceeded to a Master of Arts degree. In 1927 he was appointed lecturer at Merton College, where he stayed until 1930. He then became a lecturer at the London School of Economics.

In 1931, Rowse contested the parliamentary seat of Penryn and Falmouth for the Labour Party, but was unsuccessful, finishing third behind a Liberal. In the general election of 1935 he again stood unsuccessfully, but managed to finish in second place, ahead of the Liberal. In both the 1931 and 1935 elections, Maurice Petherick was returned as a Conservative MP to Parliament, albeit with a minority of the vote. Rowse supported calls made by Sir Stafford Cripps and others for a "Popular Front". Cripps was expelled from the Labour Party for his views. Rowse worked to get agreement by Labour and Liberal parties in Devon and Cornwall, making a common cause with the Liberal MP Sir Richard Acland. A general election was expected to take place in 1939, and Rowse, who was again Labour's candidate for Penryn & Falmouth, was not expected to have a Liberal opponent. That would increase his chances of winning. But, due to outbreak of war, the election did not take place and his political career was effectively ended.

Undeterred, Rowse chose to continue his career by seeking administrative positions at Oxford becoming Sub-Warden of All Souls College. In 1952, he failed in his candidacy for election as Warden against John Sparrow. Shortly afterwards he began what became regular trips to The Huntington Library in Southern California, where for many years he was a senior research fellow. He received a doctorate (DLitt) from Oxford University in 1953. After delivering the British Academy's 1957 Raleigh Lecture on history about Sir Richard Grenville's place in English history, Rowse was selected as a fellow of the academy (FBA) in 1958.

Rowse published about 100 books. By the mid-20th century, he was a celebrated author and much-travelled lecturer, especially in the United States. He also published many popular articles in newspapers and magazines in Great Britain and the United States. His brilliance was widely recognised. His knack for the sensational, as well as his academic boldness (which some considered to be irresponsible carelessness), sustained his reputation. His opinions on rival popular historians, such as Hugh Trevor-Roper and A. J. P. Taylor, were expressed sometimes in very ripe terms.

In his later years, Rowse moved increasingly towards the political right, and many considered him to be part of the Tory tradition by the time he died. One of Rowse's lifelong themes in his books and articles was his condemnation of the Conservative-dominated National Government's policy of appeasement of Nazi Germany in the 1930s, and the economic and political consequences for Great Britain of fighting a Second World War with Germany. He also criticized his former Labour Party colleagues–including George Lansbury, Kingsley Martin, and Richard Crossman—for endorsing appeasement, writing "not one of the Left intellectuals could republish what they wrote in the Thirties without revealing what idiotic judgments they made about events." Another was his horror at the degradation of standards in modern society. He is reported as saying: "...this filthy twentieth century. I hate its guts".

Despite international academic success, Rowse remained proud of his Cornish roots. He retired from Oxford in 1973 to Trenarren House, his Cornish home, from where he remained active as writer, reviewer and conversationalist until immobilised by a stroke the year before his death. His ashes are buried in the Campdowns Cemetery, Charlestown near St Austell.

Elizabethan and Shakespearean scholarship
Rowse's early works focus on 16th-century England and his first full-length historical monograph, Sir Richard Grenville of the Revenge (1937), was a biography of a 16th-century sailor. His next was Tudor Cornwall (1941), a lively detailed account of Cornish society in the 16th century. He consolidated his reputation with a one-volume general history of England, The Spirit of English History (1943), but his most important work was the historical trilogy The Elizabethan Age: The England of Elizabeth (1950), The Expansion of Elizabethan England (1955), and The Elizabethan Renaissance (1971–72), respectively examine the society, overseas exploration, and culture of late 16th-century England.

In 1963 Rowse began to concentrate on William Shakespeare, starting with a biography in which he claimed to have dated all the sonnets, identified Christopher Marlowe as the suitor's rival and solved all but one of the other problems posed by the sonnets. His failure to acknowledge his reliance upon the work of other scholars alienated some of his peers, but he won popular acclaim. In 1973 he published Shakespeare the Man, in which he claimed to have solved the final problem – the identity of the 'Dark Lady': from a close reading of the sonnets and the diaries of Simon Forman, he asserted that she must have been Emilia Lanier, whose poems he would later collect. He suggested that Shakespeare had been influenced by the feud between the Danvers and Long families in Wiltshire, when he wrote Romeo and Juliet. The Danverses were friends of Henry Wriothesley, 3rd Earl of Southampton.

Rowse's "discoveries" about Shakespeare's sonnets amount to the following:

 The Fair Youth was the 19-year-old Henry Wriothesley, 3rd Earl of Southampton, extremely handsome and bisexual.
 The sonnets were written 1592–1594/5.
 The "rival poet" was Christopher Marlowe.
 The "Dark Lady" was Emilia Lanier. His use of the diaries of Simon Forman, which contained material about her, influenced other scholars.
 Christopher Marlowe's death is recorded in the sonnets.
 Shakespeare was a heterosexual man, who was faced with an unusual situation when the handsome, young, bisexual Earl of Southampton fell in love with him.

Rowse was dismissive of those who rejected his views. He supported his conclusions. In the case of Shakespeare's sexuality, he emphasised the playwright's heterosexual inclinations by noting that he had impregnated an older woman by the time he was 18, and was consequently obliged to marry her. Moreover, he fathered three children by the time he was 21. In the sonnets, Shakespeare's explicit erotic interest lies with the Dark Lady; he obsesses about her. Shakespeare was still married and Rowse believes he was having an extramarital affair.

Personal attitudes

The diary excerpts published in 2003 reveal that "he was an overt even rather proud homosexual in a pre-Wolfenden age, fascinated by young policemen and sailors, obsessively speculating on the sexual proclivities of everyone he meets". Much later, following retirement, he said, "of course, I used to be a homo; but now, when it doesn't matter, if anything I'm a hetero".

He was aware of his own intelligence from earliest childhood, and obsessed that others either did not accept this fact, or not quickly enough. The diaries describe what he said were "a series of often inane jealousies".

He described a "Slacker State": "I don't want to have my money scalped off me to maintain other people's children. I don't like other people; I particularly don't like their children; I deeply disapprove of their proliferation making the globe uninhabitable. The fucking idiots – I don't want to pay for their fucking."

Literary career
Rowse's first book was On History, a Study of Present Tendencies published in 1927 as the seventh volume of Kegan Paul's Psyche Miniature General Series. In 1931 he contributed to T. S. Eliot's quarterly review The Criterion. In 1935 he co-edited Charles Henderson's Essays in Cornish History for the Clarendon Press. His best-seller was his first volume of autobiography, A Cornish Childhood, first published by Jonathan Cape in 1942, which has gone on to sell nearly half a million copies worldwide. It describes his hard struggle to get to the University of Oxford and his love/hate relationship with Cornwall.

His most controversial book (at the time of publication) was on the subject of human sexuality: Homosexuals in History (1977).

Rowse wrote poetry all his life. He contributed poems to Public School Verse whilst at St Austell Grammar School. He also had verse published in Oxford 1923, Oxford 1924, and Oxford 1925. His collected poems A Life were published in 1981. The poetry is mainly autobiographical, descriptive of place (especially Cornwall) and people he knew and cared for, e.g. The Progress of Love, which describes his platonic love for Adam von Trott, a handsome and aristocratic German youth who studied at Oxford in the 1930s and who was later executed for his part in the July Plot of 1944 to kill Hitler. Unusually for a British poet, Rowse wrote a great number of poems inspired by American scenery.

Biographer
He wrote other biographies of English historical and literary figures, and many other historical works. His biographies include studies of Shakespeare, Marlowe, and the Earl of Southampton, the major players in the sonnets, as well as later luminaries of English literature such as John Milton, Jonathan Swift and Matthew Arnold. A devoted cat-lover, he also wrote the biographies of several cats who came to live with him at Trenarren, claiming that it was as much a challenge to write the biography of a favourite cat as it was a Queen of England. He also published a number of short stories, mainly about Cornwall, of interest more for their thinly veiled autobiographical resonances than their literary merit. His last book, My View of Shakespeare, published in 1996, summed up his life-time's appreciation of The Bard of Stratford. The book was dedicated "To HRH The Prince of Wales in common devotion to William Shakespeare".

Bibliophile
One of Rowse's great enthusiasms was collecting books, and he owned many first editions, many of them bearing his acerbic annotations. For example, his copy of the January 1924 edition of The Adelphi magazine edited by John Middleton Murry bears a pencilled note after Murry's poem In Memory of Katherine Mansfield: 'Sentimental gush on the part of JMM. And a bad poem. A.L.R.'

Upon his death in 1997 he bequeathed his book collection to the University of Exeter, and his personal archive of manuscripts, diaries, and correspondence. In 1998 the University Librarian selected about sixty books from Rowse's own working library and a complete set of his published books. The Royal Institution of Cornwall selected some of the remaining books and the rest were sold to dealers. The London booksellers Heywood Hill produced two catalogues of books from his library.

Honours
Rowse was elected a Fellow of the British Academy (FBA), of the Royal Historical Society (FRHistS) and of the Royal Society of Literature (FRSL).

In addition to his DLitt (Oxon) degree (1953), Rowse received the honorary degrees of DLitt from the University of Exeter in 1960 and DCL from the University of New Brunswick, Fredericton, Canada, the same year.

In 1968 he was made a Bard of Gorseth Kernow, taking the bardic name Lef A Gernow ('Voice of Cornwall'), reflecting his high standing in the Cornish community.

He was elected to the Athenaeum Club under Rule II in 1972, and received the Benson Medal of the Royal Society of Literature in 1982.

Rowse was appointed a Companion of Honour (CH) in the 1997 New Year Honours.

Posthumous reputation

As well as his own appearances on radio and television, Rowse has been depicted in various TV drama documentaries about British politics in the 1930s and appeasement.

Christopher William Hill's radio play Accolades, rebroadcast on BBC Radio 4 in March 2007 as a tribute to its star, Ian Richardson, who had died the previous month, covers the period leading up to the publication of Shakespeare the Man in 1973 and publicity surrounding Rowse's unshakable confidence that he had discovered the identity of the Dark Lady of the Sonnets. It was broadcast again on 9 July 2008.

A Cornish Childhood has also been adapted for voices (in the style of Under Milk Wood) by Judith Cook.

Selected works 
 On History: a Study of Present Tendencies, London: Kegan Paul, Trench, Trubner & Co., 1927
 Science and History: a New View of History, London: W. W. Norton, 1928
 Politics and the Younger Generation, London: Faber & Faber, 1931
 The Question of the House of Lords, London: Hogarth Press, 1934
 Queen Elizabeth and Her Subjects (with G. B. Harrison), London: Allen & Unwin, 1935
 Mr. Keynes and the Labour Movement, London: Macmillan, 1936
 Sir Richard Grenville of the "Revenge", London: Jonathan Cape, 1937
 What is Wrong with the Germans?, 1940
 Tudor Cornwall, London: Jonathan Cape, 1941
 A Cornish Childhood, London: Jonathan Cape, 1942
 The Spirit of English History, London: Jonathan Cape, 1943
 The English Spirit: Essays in History and Literature, London: Macmillan, 1944
 West-Country Stories, London: Macmillan, 1945
 The Use of History (key volume in the "Teach Yourself History" series), London: Hodder & Stoughton, 1946
 The End of an Epoch: Reflections on Contemporary History, London: Macmillan, 1947
 The England of Elizabeth: the Structure of Society. London: Macmillan, 1950
 The English Past: Evocation of Persons and Places, London: Macmillan, 1951
 An Elizabethan Garland, London: Macmillan, 1953
 The Expansion of Elizabethan England, London: Macmillan, 1955
 The Early Churchills, London: Macmillan, 1956
 The Later Churchills, London: Macmillan, 1958
 The Elizabethans and America: The Trevelyan Lectures at Cambridge, 1958, London, Macmillan, 1959
 St Austell: Church, Town, Parish, St Austell: H. E. Warne, 1960
 All Souls and Appeasement: a Contribution to Contemporary History, London: Macmillan, 1961
 Ralegh and the Throckmortons, London: Macmillan, 1962
 William Shakespeare: a Biography, London: Macmillan, 1963
 Christopher Marlowe: a biography, London: Macmillan, 1964
 Shakespeare's Sonnets, London: Macmillan, 1964
 A Cornishman at Oxford, London: Jonathan Cape, 1965
 Shakespeare's Southampton: Patron of Virginia, London: Macmillan, 1965
 Bosworth Field and the Wars of the Roses, London: Macmillan, 1966
 Cornish Stories, London: Macmillan, 1967
 A Cornish Anthology, London: Macmillan, 1968
 The Cornish in America, London: Macmillan, 1969
 The Elizabethan Renaissance: the Life of Society, London: Macmillan, 1971
 The Elizabethan Renaissance: the Cultural Achievement, London: Macmillan, 1972
 The Tower of London in the History of the Nation, London: Weidenfeld & Nicolson, 1972
 Shakespeare The Man, London: Macmillan, 1973
 Windsor Castle In the History of the Nation, London: Weidenfeld & Nicolson, 1974
 Victorian and Edwardian Cornwall from old photographs, London: Batsford, 1974 (Introduction and commentaries by Rowse; ten extracts from Betjeman)
 Simon Forman: Sex and Society in Shakespeare's Age, London: Weidenfeld & Nicolson, 1974
 Discoveries and Reviews: from Renaissance to Restoration, London: Macmillan, 1975
 Oxford: In the History of the Nation, London: Weidenfeld & Nicolson, 1975
 Jonathan Swift: Major Prophet, London, Thames & Hudson, 1975
 A Cornishman Abroad, London: Jonathan Cape, 1976
 Matthew Arnold: Poet and Prophet, London: Thames & Hudson, 1976
 Homosexuals in History, London: Weidenfeld & Nicolson, 1977
 Shakespeare the Elizabethan, London: Weidenfeld & Nicolson, 1977
 Milton the Puritan: Portrait of a Mind, London: Macmillan, 1977
 The Byrons and the Trevanions, London: Weidenfeld & Nicolson, 1978
 A Man of the Thirties, London: Weidenfeld & Nicolson, 1979
 Memories of Men and Women, London: Eyre Methuen, 1980
 A Man of Singular Virtue: being a Life of Sir Thomas More by his Son-in-Law William Roper, and a Selection of More's Letters, London: Folio Society, 1980 (Editor)
 Shakespeare's Globe: his Intellectual and Moral Outlook, London: Weidenfeld & Nicolson, 1981
 A Life: Collected Poems, Edinburgh: William Blackwood, 1981
 Eminent Elizabethans, London: Macmillan, 1983
 Night at the Carn and Other Stories, London: William Kimber, 1984
 Shakespeare's Characters: a Complete Guide, London: Methuen, 1984
 Glimpses of the Great, London: Methuen, 1985
 The Little Land of Cornwall, Gloucester: Alan Sutton, 1986
 A Quartet of Cornish Cats, London: Weidenfeld & Nicolson, 1986
 Stories From Trenarren, London: William Kimber, 1986
 Reflections on the Puritan Revolution, London: Methuen, 1986
 The Poet Auden: a Personal Memoir, London: Weidenfeld & Nicolson, 1987
 Court and Country: Studies in Tudor Social History, Brighton: Harvester Press, 1987
 Froude the Historian: Victorian Man of Letters, Gloucester: Alan Sutton, 1987
 Quiller-Couch: a Portrait of "Q", London: Methuen, 1988
 A. L. Rowse's Cornwall: a Journey through Cornwall's Past and Present, London: Weidenfeld & Nicolson, 1988
 Friends and Contemporaries, London: Methuen, 1989
 The Controversial Colensos, Redruth: Dyllansow Truran, 1989
 Discovering Shakespeare: a Chapter in Literary History, London: Weidenfeld & Nicolson, 1989
 Four Caroline Portraits, London: Duckworth, 1993
 All Souls in My Time, London: Duckworth, 1993
 The Regicides and the Puritan Revolution, London: Duckworth, 1994
 Historians I Have Known, London: Duckworth, 1995
 My View of Shakespeare, London: Duckworth, 1996
 Cornish Place Rhymes, Tiverton: Cornwall Books, 1997 (posthumous commemorative volume begun by the author; preface by the editor, S. Butler)
 The Elizabethan Age (a four-volume set composed of The England of Elizabeth; The Expansion of Elizabethan England; The Elizabethan Renaissance: The Life of the Society; The Elizabethan Renaissance: The Cultural Achievement), London: Folio Society, 2012

Biography and bibliography 
 Capstick, Tony (1997), A. L. Rowse: an Illustrated Bibliography, Wokingham: Hare's Ear Publication 
 Cauveren, Sydney (2000), A. L. Rowse: A Bibliophile's Extensive Bibliography, Lanham, Maryland: Scarecrow Press 
 Cauveren, Sydney (2001), "A. L. Rowse: Historian and Friend", Contemporary Review, December 2001, pp. 340–346
 Jacob, Valerie (2001), Tregonissey to Trenarren: A. L. Rowse – The Cornish Years, St. Austell: Valerie Jacob 
 Ollard, Richard (1999), A Man of Contradictions: a Life of A. L. Rowse, London: Allen Lane 
 Ollard, Richard (2003), The Diaries of A. L. Rowse, London: Allen Lane 
 Whetter, James (2003), Dr. A. L. Rowse: Poet, Historian, Lover of Cornwall, Gorran, St. Austell: Lyfrow Trelyspen 
 Payton, Philip (2005), A. L. Rowse and Cornwall, Exeter: University of Exeter Press 
 Donald Adamson is due to publish a biography of A. L. Rowse (from a friend's perspective), see article in the International Literary Quarterly.
 Slattery-Christy, David (2017), Other People's Fu**ing! An Oxford Affair. New play exploring the relationship between A.L. Rowse and Adam von Trott during the 1930s in Oxford. Published by Christyplays. www.christyplays.com

References

External links

 
 Papers of A L Rowse: research, literary and personal manuscripts at the University of Exeter

1903 births
1997 deaths
People from St Austell
Alumni of Christ Church, Oxford
Academics of the London School of Economics
British biographers
Shakespearean scholars
English gay writers
English LGBT poets
Labour Party (UK) parliamentary candidates
Fellows of All Souls College, Oxford
Fellows of the British Academy
Fellows of the Royal Historical Society
Fellows of the Royal Society of Literature
British book and manuscript collectors
Bards of Gorsedh Kernow
Historians of Cornwall
Members of the Order of the Companions of Honour
Burials in Cornwall
Poets from Cornwall
20th-century British poets
20th-century British historians
20th-century biographers
People educated at St Austell Grammar School
English LGBT politicians